Lefkara is a village and a community of the municipality of Servia. The 2011 census recorded 211 inhabitants in the village. The community of Lefkara covers an area of 25.25 km2.

See also
List of settlements in the Kozani regional unit

References

Populated places in Kozani (regional unit)